Something to Love is the fourth studio album by Los Angeles, California -based band, L.T.D., released in 1977 on the A&M label.

Commercial performance
The album peaked at No. 1 on the R&B albums chart. It also reached No. 21 on the Billboard 200. The album features the singles "(Every Time I Turn Around) Back in Love Again", which peaked at No. 1 on the Billboard Hot Soul Singles chart and No. 4 on the Billboard Hot 100 chart, and "Never Get Enough of Your Love", which charted at No. 8 on the Hot Soul Singles chart and No. 56 on the Billboard Hot 100.

Track listing

Personnel 
Jeffrey Osborne - Lead Vocals (tracks 1-3, 5-7, 9), Backing Vocals (All tracks), Drums (Tracks 4, 6), Percussion (All tracks)
Billy Osborne - Organ, Percussion (All tracks), Lead Vocals (tracks 4, 8), Backing Vocals (All tracks)
Jimmie Davis - Clavinet, Electric Piano, Piano, Backing Vocals
Henry Davis - Bass, Backing Vocals
Bernorce Blackman, John McGhee - Guitar
Carle Vickers - Flute, Flugelhorn, Soprano Saxophone, Trumpet
Abraham "Onion" Miller - Tenor Saxophone, Backing Vocals
Lorenzo Carnegie - Alto Saxophone, Tenor Saxophone
Jake Riley - Trombone
Melvin Webb - Drums (tracks 1-3, 5, 7-9)
Lorraine Johnson - Backing Vocals

Charts
Album

Singles

See also
List of number-one R&B albums of 1977 (U.S.)

References

External links
 

1977 albums
L.T.D. (band) albums
Albums produced by Bobby Martin
Albums arranged by Bobby Martin
A&M Records albums
Albums recorded at Total Experience Recording Studios